The Mahdi Mosque is a mosque in Old Harbour, Saint Catherine Parish, Jamaica.

History
The mosque was built in 2011 as the first Ahmadiyya mosque in the country.

Activities
The mosque has held various conferences.

See also
 Islam in Jamaica

References

2011 establishments in Jamaica
Ahmadiyya mosques
Buildings and structures in Saint Catherine Parish
Islam in Jamaica
Mosques completed in 2011
Mosques in North America
Religious buildings and structures in Jamaica